The 2019–20 season was the inaugural season of KK Cedevita Olimpija. The club competed in the Slovenian League, the Adriatic League and the EuroCup.

Cedevita Olimpija has lost two cup finals during the season, the 2019 Adriatic Supercup and the 2020 Slovenian Cup. The Slovenian League and the Adriatic League seasons were cancelled due to the COVID-19 pandemic.

Overview 
On 13 June 2019, the management boards of Cedevita and Olimpija have confirmed the appointment of Davor Užbinec as a general manager and Sani Bečirović as a sports director. On 8 July, it's announced that the first club's coach is Croatian coach Slaven Rimac, while the first player is Slovenian player Edo Murić. The Petrol Olimpija players from the 2018–19 season, Marko Simonović, Issuf Sanon, Petar Vujačić and David Kralj joined the club in July. The Cedevita Zagreb players in the previous season, Filip Krušlin, Andrija Stipanović, as well as Murić, joined the club in July.

Newly signed forward Marko Simonović was a member of the Serbia national team at the 2019 FIBA Basketball World Cup in China. On 11 September, guard Jaka Blažič was named the first team captain.

On 28 September 2019, Cedevita Olimpija lost to Partizan NIS in the 2019 ABA Supercup final in Zagreb, Croatia.

Season cancellation 
On 12 March 2020, ABA League Assembly suspended the remainder of the 2019–20 season "until further notice" following the coronavirus pandemic. The club still remains to play one game until the end of the regular season and to reach the 2020 playoffs. On the same day, the Basketball Federation of Slovenia suspended the remainder of the 2020 Championship Group season due to the same reason. Prior to the Slovenian league suspension, the club played two games. On 20 March, the Basketball Federation cancelled its competitions due to the COVID-19 pandemic. On 27 May, the ABA League Assembly cancelled the 2019–20 season due to the COVID-19 pandemic.

Players

Squad information

Players with multiple nationalities
   Ivan Marinković
   Andrija Stipanović

Depth chart

Transactions

Players In

|}

Players Out

|}

Club

Technical Staff 
On 27 January 2020, Cedevita Olimpija and coach Slaven Rimac have agreed on terminating their contract on mutual consent. On the same day, Cedevita Olimpija appointed a Slovenian coach Jurica Golemac as the new head coach. In January, an assistant coach Marko Maravič and a conditioning coach Slaven Hlupić left the staff. Filip Ujaković was named the new conditioning coach in January.

Uniform

Supplier: Adidas
Main sponsor: Cedevita / Petrol
Back sponsor: Triglav, Spar
Shorts sponsor: Union

Pre-season and friendlies
Cedevita Olimpija played eight pre-season friendly games. They played at the 2019 Mirza Delibašić Memorial together with Budućnost VOLI (Montenegro), Gaziantep (Turkey), and U Cluj-Napoca (Romania) from 6–7 September in Sarajevo, Bosnia and Herzegovina. Cedevita Olimpija won the 15th Mirza Delibašić Memorial.

Notes
 MDM Mirza Delibašić Memorial
 DIT Desio International Tournament

Competitions

Overall

Overview

Slovenian League 

The club will join the League in the second part of the 2019–20 season.

Championship group

Results summary

Results by round

Matches

Adriatic League

Regular season

Results summary

Results by round

Matches

EuroCup

Regular season

Results summary

Results by round

Matches

Adriatic Supercup

The 2019 Adriatic Supercup was the 3rd season of the Adriatic cup tournament which was held in September 2019 in Zagreb, Croatia. Cedevita Olimpija lost to Partizan NIS in the final.

Slovenian Cup
The 2020 Slovenian Cup is the 29th season of the national cup tournament. The club joined the Cup in the quarterfinals.

Individual awards

Adriatic League 
MVP of the Round

Club Supporters 

MVP of the Month

Statistics

Slovenian League

Adriatic League

EuroCup

ABA Super Cup

Slovenian Cup

Head coaches records 

Updated:

See also 
 2019–20 KK Crvena zvezda season
 2019–20 KK Partizan season

References

External links
 
 Cedevita Olimpija at the EuroCup
 Cedevita Olimpija at kzs.si

KK Cedevita Olimpija
Cedevita Olimpija
Cedevita Olimpija
Cedevita Olimpija